Redcar Town Football Club is a football club based in Redcar, England.

History
Redcar Town were formed in 2014, being placed in the Teesside League Division Two, winning promotion to Division One in their first season. Prior to the current Redcar Town forming, a team by the same name competed in the Wearside League between 1998 and 2003. In 2017, Redcar joined the North Riding League, following the Teesside League merging with the Eskvale & Cleveland League. In 2021, the club was admitted into the Northern League Division Two. Redcar Town entered the FA Vase for the first time in 2021–22.

Ground
The club currently play at the Mo Mowlam Memorial Park in Redcar.

References

Redcar
Association football clubs established in 2014
2014 establishments in England
Football clubs in England
Football clubs in North Yorkshire
Teesside Football League
Northern Football League